The Capitol Conference was a high school athletic conference in the Illinois High School Association (IHSA), based in Central Illinois.  The conference operated from 1964 to 1983.

The original membership roster included Decatur Eisenhower, Decatur MacArthur, Jacksonville, Springfield Griffin, and Springfield Lanphier.  Springfield Southeast was admitted in 1967, Champaign Centennial in 1968, and Normal Community in 1971.  The conference remained at eight members for the remainder of its history.

The impetus for its demise came inadvertently and unknowingly from a member of the neighboring Big Twelve Conference.  At the time, the Big Twelve Conference membership roster included Bloomington, Champaign Central, Danville, Stephen Decatur, Lincoln, Mattoon, Springfield, and Urbana.  Initial discussions were instigated by representatives of Springfield High School to look into the potential feasibility of swapping schools within the two conferences where there was some common city "overlap" (this was present in Bloomington-Normal, Champaign-Urbana, Decatur, and Springfield).  This would allow each conference to align even more tightly geographically, thus increasing rivalries and reducing costs.

Rather than proceed in that direction, the remaining members of the Big Twelve Conference alternatively decided to offer membership to all of the Capitol Conference non-Springfield "overlap" institutions (Champaign Centennial, Decatur Eisenhower, Decatur MacArthur, and Normal Community) plus Rantoul, while jettisoning Springfield.  Those schools accepted, leaving the Capitol Conference with only Jacksonville, Springfield Griffin, Springfield Lanphier, and Springfield Southeast.

As a result, the conference folded.  Jacksonville and Springfield Griffin remained independent, while Springfield Lanphier and Springfield Southeast (as well as Springfield) joined the Peoria-based Mid-State # Conference (where "#" fluctuated with the number of current members at any given time).

In 1993, the four former Capitol Conference outliers (Jacksonville, Springfield Griffin (now known as Springfield Sacred Heart-Griffin), Springfield Lanphier, and Springfield Southeast) came back together in the newly formed Central State Eight Conference.  Its original roster also included original Big Twelve Conference castoff Springfield as well as (at that time) current Big Twelve Conference member Lincoln.  Chatham Glenwood and Taylorville rounded out the initial eight.

Former Capitol Conference (and then current Big Twelve Conference) schools Decatur Eisenhower and Decatur MacArthur subsequently joined the Central State Eight Conference in 2014.

References

External links
Illinois High School Association (IHSA) Official Web-Site

Illinois high school sports conferences
Education in Champaign County, Illinois
Education in Macon County, Illinois
Education in McLean County, Illinois
Education in Morgan County, Illinois
Education in Sangamon County, Illinois